Ras-related protein Rab-3B is a protein that in humans is encoded by the RAB3B gene.

Interactions 

RAB3B has been shown to interact with RPH3A.

References

Further reading